This is a list of earthquakes in 2022. Only earthquakes of magnitude 6 or above are included, unless they result in significant damage and/or casualties, or are notable for some other reason. All dates are listed according to UTC time. Maximum intensities are based on the Modified Mercalli intensity scale. The year 2022 was moderately active for earthquakes, with eleven major events, the majority of them occurring in Oceania. Three deadly events occurred in Afghanistan, with the deadliest event of the year killing over 1,100 in the eastern part of the country near Pakistan. The largest earthquakes occurred in Papua New Guinea and Mexico, with both events measuring 7.6. Deadly events also struck Indonesia, China, Papua New Guinea, the Philippines and Poland.

Compared to other years

By death toll 

Listed are earthquakes with at least 10 dead.

By magnitude 

Listed are earthquakes with at least 7.0 magnitude.

By month

January

February

March

April

May

June

July

August

September

October

November

December

See also 

 
 Lists of 21st-century earthquakes
 List of earthquakes 2021–2030
 Lists of earthquakes by year
 Lists of earthquakes

Notes

References 

Earthquakes
Earthquakes
2022
 
2022